Lyle Alfred Skinner (born 14 January 1949) is a former Australian rules footballer who played with Central District in the South Australian National Football League (SANFL) and Fitzroy in the Victorian Football League (VFL).

A centreman, Skinner spent some of 1971 in Victoria on national service and made two appearances for Fitzroy. He played in a win over North Melbourne and the following week kicked his only VFL goal against Collingwood.

Apart from his brief stint at Fitzroy, Skinner was a Central District player for his entire career and captained the club in the 1976 and 1977 SANFL seasons.

Skinner coached Hills Football League club Lobethal in 2005.

References

1949 births
Australian rules footballers from South Australia
Fitzroy Football Club players
Central District Football Club players
Living people